Slaughter Creek is a stream in the U.S. state of South Dakota.

Slaughter Creek has the name of a local pioneer.

See also
List of rivers of South Dakota

References

Rivers of Charles Mix County, South Dakota
Rivers of South Dakota